The California Collegiate Athletic Association women's basketball tournament is the annual conference women's basketball championship tournament for the California Collegiate Athletic Association. The tournament was held annually between 1986 and 1998, discontinued between 1999 and 2007, and then held annually again after it was re-established in 2008. It is a single-elimination tournament and seeding is based on regular season records.

The winner, named conference champion, receives the conference's automatic bid to the NCAA Women's Division II Basketball Championship.

Results

First tournament (1986–1998)

Second tournament (2008–present)

Championship records

 Cal State Stanislaus, San Francisco State, and Sonoma State have not yet qualified for the CCAA tournament finals.
 Cal Poly San Luis Obispo, Cal State Bakersfield, Chapman, and Grand Canyon never qualified for the CCAA tournament finals as conference members.
 Schools highlighted in pink are former members of the CCAA.

See also
CCAA men's basketball tournament

References

NCAA Division II women's basketball conference tournaments
Tournament
Recurring sporting events established in 1986